Alan William Hangsleben (born February 22, 1953) is an American former professional ice hockey defenseman from Warroad, Minnesota. He played for the New England Whalers of the World Hockey Association between 1974 and 1979, and then in the National Hockey League with the Hartford Whalers, Washington Capitals, and Los Angeles Kings between 1979 and 1982. Internationally Hangsleben played for the American national team at three World Championships and the 1976 Canada Cup.

Playing career
Selected in 1973 by both the Montreal Canadiens of the National Hockey League and the New England Whalers of the World Hockey Association while still playing for the University of North Dakota men's ice hockey team, Hangsleben chose to sign a pro contract with the Whalers. Hangsleben made a total of 334 WHA game appearances for the Whalers in 1975–1979. The Canadiens, who still retained his NHL rights, left him exposed for the 1979 NHL Expansion Draft, and he was claimed by the Hartford Whalers when they were admitted into the NHL in 1979.

Hangsleben was traded to the Washington Capitals during the middle of the 1979–80 NHL season in exchange for Tom Rowe, and played for the Capitals until he was released early into the 1981–82 NHL season. Hangsleben would sign with the Los Angeles Kings and play for them for the rest of that season. He played two seasons in the American Hockey League before retiring in 1984.

International play
Hangsleben played for Team USA at the 1973,1974 and 1981 Ice Hockey World Championship tournaments. He was also a member of the U.S. team at the inaugural 1976 Canada Cup tournament.

Career statistics

Regular season and playoffs

International

Awards and honors

References

External links

Profile at hockeydraftcentral.com

1953 births
Living people
AHCA Division I men's ice hockey All-Americans
American men's ice hockey defensemen
Hartford Whalers players
Hershey Bears players
Ice hockey players from Minnesota
Los Angeles Kings players
Moncton Alpines (AHL) players
Montreal Canadiens draft picks
New England Whalers draft picks
New England Whalers players
New Haven Nighthawks players
North Dakota Fighting Hawks men's ice hockey players
People from Warroad, Minnesota
Washington Capitals players